Lawrence Garth Wasden (born November 3, 1957) is an American attorney and politician who served as the Idaho Attorney General from 2003 to 2023. First elected in 2002, he was the longest-serving attorney general in Idaho history. Wasden was re-elected four more times before being defeated in the 2022 Republican primary by Raúl Labrador.

Education
Wasden earned a Bachelor of Arts degree from Brigham Young University in 1982 and a Juris Doctor from the University of Idaho College of Law in 1985.

Career
Wasden was admitted to the Idaho State Bar in 1985. He served as deputy prosecuting attorney in Canyon County, Idaho and prosecuting attorney in Owyhee County, Idaho. Wasden later served as chief of staff and deputy chief of staff to the Idaho attorney general and as a deputy attorney general for the Idaho State Tax Commission.

Attorney general of Idaho 

In July 2017, Texas Attorney General Ken Paxton led a group of Republican Attorneys General from nine other states, including Wasden, plus Idaho Governor Butch Otter, in threatening the Donald Trump administration that they would litigate if the president did not terminate the Deferred Action for Childhood Arrivals policy that had been implemented by President Barack Obama. Tennessee Attorney General Herbert Slatery subsequently reversed his position and withdrew his participation from the proposed suit. Slatery went further to urge passage of the DREAM Act. The other attorneys general who joined in making the threats against Trump included Steve Marshall of Alabama, Leslie Rutledge of Arkansas, Derek Schmidt of Kansas, Jeff Landry of Louisiana, Doug Peterson of Nebraska, Alan Wilson of South Carolina, and Patrick Morrisey of West Virginia.

In 2019, Wasden and 16 other A.G. declined to join a letter in support of the Secure and Fair Enforcement (SAFE) Banking Act (H.R. 1595), sponsored by U.S. Rep. Ed Perlmutter (D-Colo.), which would permit marijuana-related businesses in states and territories to use the banking system.

In 2020, Wasden declined to join the Texas v. Pennsylvania, saying "Idaho is a sovereign state and should be free to govern itself without interference from any other state. Likewise, Idaho should respect the sovereignty of its sister states."

2022 primary election 

In 2022, Wasden faced heavy opposition from the right. Attorney Arthur Macomber and former Congressman Raúl Labrador both filed to run against Wasden. Wasden lost the May 17 primary to Labrador by over thirteen points.

Personal
Wasden is married and has four children.

Electoral history

References

External links

NAAG bio

21st-century American politicians
Brigham Young University alumni
Idaho Attorneys General
Idaho lawyers
Living people
People from Nampa, Idaho
University of Idaho College of Law alumni
Year of birth missing (living people)